Archies may refer to:

 Archie (franchise), a media franchise created by American publisher Archie Comics
 Archie (comic book)
 The Archie Show, a 1968 animated TV series
 The Archies, a fictional garage band, and associated virtual band made up of studio musicians
 The Archies (album), 1968
 The New Archies, a 1987 TV animated TV series
 Archies (company), an Indian greeting card company
 The Gothic Archies, a self-described goth-bubblegum band
 Archies Creek, a small town in Victoria, Australia

See also
 Archie (disambiguation)